Monique Pauzé  is a Canadian politician who was elected to the House of Commons in the 2015 election from the electoral district of Repentigny. Initially elected as a member of the Bloc Québécois, she, along with six other Bloc MPs, resigned from the Bloc's caucus to sit as an independent MP on February 28, 2018 citing conflicts with the leadership style of Martine Ouellet. She rejoined the Bloc Québécois caucus on September 17, 2018.

Electoral record

References

External links

Living people
Members of the House of Commons of Canada from Quebec
Bloc Québécois MPs
Women members of the House of Commons of Canada
21st-century Canadian politicians
21st-century Canadian women politicians
Québec debout MPs
1950 births
Politicians from Montreal